Beth El Congregation is a synagogue located in Pikesville, Maryland. Established in 1948, Beth El provides worship in the Conservative tradition.

Clergy and leadership
Rabbi Steven Schwartz, Rabbi Dana Saroken, Cantor Thom King and Cantor Educator Melanie Blatt provide spiritual leadership at Beth El Congregation.

Josh Bender is the executive director. Dr. Ed Mishner is Beth El's president.

Religious programs and activities
Beth El hosts twice daily religious services, Shabbat services, and Jewish holiday services. 

Beth El holds brit milah and baby naming ceremonies for newborns, b'nai mitzvah ceremonies for students, and aufruf ceremonies for engaged couples.

Beth El operates a preschool and an after-school program with a religious curriculum. Beth El's youth group for teenagers began in 1964.

Beth El has hosted classes and religious study groups for adults since 1949.

History

Founding
In 1948, a group of nine lay leaders of Beth Tfiloh Congregation advocated for holding mixed-gender religious services and expanded b'nai mitvah ceremonies. Their advocacy was unsuccessful, and instead they formed Beth El Congregation.

Beth El Congregation was established in 1948 as the first Conservative congregation in Maryland. Beth El's establishment was announced at an inaugural dinner held at Baltimore's Sheraton-Belvedere Hotel on May 10, 1948.

First synagogue
The synagogue was designed by architect Erich Mendelsohn and built by Cogswell Construction Company.

New synagogue
When Beth El's membership increased from 97 families to 1,100 families between 1950 and 1955, Beth El needed a larger place of worship. Groundbreaking on the new synagogue in Pikesville began on June 7, 1959. Rabbi Jacob B. Agus and Cantor Saul Z. Hammerman were present.

The masonry work was done by McCullough Brothers. 

The main synagogue was designed with a 1,500-seat sanctuary, religious school classrooms for 600 students, an assembly hall for 350 people, a social hall designed for 1,000 people, and dining facilities with a capacity of 600 people. The main entrance was surrounded by two large granite pillars, representing pillars built by King Solomon at the First Holy Temple. The main entrance was built with three brass and ceramic plaques that use the Hebrew letters for the word truth, symbolizing creation, revelation, and redemption. The sanctuary was built with ten stained glass windows symbolizing the Jewish festivals. The sanctuary's 24 narrow windows symbolize the 24 books of the Tanakh.

The synagogue was dedicated in 1960. 

In 1961, the Building Congress and Exchange gave an award for craftsmanship for the design and construction of the synagogue.

References

External links
 

1948 establishments in Maryland
Buildings and structures in Baltimore County, Maryland
Conservative synagogues in Maryland
Synagogues completed in 1960
Jewish organizations established in 1948